Alan Frederick Cathcart, 3rd Earl Cathcart  (1828–1905) was a wealthy landowner and writer on agriculture. Cathcart introduced the term "economic ornithology" at a time when there was a public debate over whether the English sparrow was a pest or a friend of the farmer.

Early life

Cathcart was the second, but eldest surviving, son of Charles Cathcart, 2nd Earl Cathcart and the former Henrietta Mather (second daughter of Thomas Mather). His father was the Commander-in-Chief, Scotland and of North America and served as the Governor-General of Canada.

He was educated in Edinburgh at the Scottish Naval and Military Academy, which was founded in 1825 and closed in 1869.

Career
He joined the British Army in Canada as a member of the Royal Welsh Fusiliers. He was an Honorary Colonel of the 1st Volunteer Battalion Yorkshire Regiment, assisted in raising the battalion, and was awarded the Volunteer Officers' Decoration. Upon his marriage he resigned from the army and devoted himself to agriculture and county business in Yorkshire. Cathcart was president of the Royal Agricultural Society in 1872–1873. He owned 5554 acres.

Personal life
On 2 April 1850 Cathcart married Elizabeth Mary Crompton (1831–1902), the eldest daughter and heiress of Sir Samuel Crompton, 1st Baronet and the former Isabella Sophia Cathcart (second daughter of the Rev. Hon. Archibald Hamilton Cathcart, third son of Charles Cathcart, 9th Lord Cathcart). Together, they were the parents of five sons and six daughters, including: 

 Hon. Isabel Cathcart (1851–1856), who died young.
 Alan Cathcart, 4th Earl Cathcart (1856–1911), who died unmarried.
 Lady Cecilia Cathcart (1857–1932), who married Capt. Edward Temple Rose, third son of Sir John Rose, 1st Baronet, in 1883.
 Hon. Charles Cathcart (1858–1880), a Lieutenant who died unmarried.
 George Cathcart, 5th Earl Cathcart (1862–1927)
 Lady Ida Cathcart (1866–1929), who married Sir Thomas Hare, 1st Baronet, in 1886.
 Lady Marion Cathcart (1867–1955)
 Lady Emily Cathcart (1868–1960)
 Hon. Reginald Cathcart (1870–1900), a Captain who served in the Second Boer War and was killed at the Relief of Ladysmith in South Africa.
 Hon. Archibald Cathcart (1873–1955)
 Lady Eva Cathcart (1874–1960)

In 1894 he was awarded an Hon. LL.D. by the University of Cambridge.

References

External links
Earl of Cathcart at the Library of Congress

1828 births
1905 deaths
British agriculturalists
Royal Welch Fusiliers officers
Earls in the Peerage of the United Kingdom